2,3-Bisphosphoglycerate 3-phosphatase (EC 3.1.3.80, MIPP1, 2,3-BPG 3-phosphatase) is an enzyme with systematic name 2,3-bisphospho-D-glycerate 3-phosphohydrolase. This enzyme catalyses the following reaction:

 2,3-bisphospho-D-glycerate + H2O  2-phospho-D-glycerate + phosphate

This reaction is a shortcut in the Luebering-Rapoport pathway.

References

External links 
 

EC 3.1.3